Lions Basketball Club, also known as simply Lions, is a Namibian basketball team based in Windhoek. The team plays in the Khomas Region's Khomas Basketball Association (KBA).

In 2020, the Lions represented Namibia in the qualifiers for the Basketball Africa League (BAL).

In African competitions
BAL Qualifiers (1 appearance)
2021 – First Round

Players

Current roster
The following was the Lions roster in the 2021 BAL qualifiers:

References

External links
Facebook profile

Basketball teams in Namibia

Road to BAL teams
Sport in Windhoek